Hydrachna is a genus of mites in the family Hydrachnidae, the sole genus of the family. There are more than 80 described species in Hydrachna.

Species
These 87 species belong to the genus Hydrachna:

 Hydrachna analis Viets & K.
 Hydrachna approximata Halik, 1940
 Hydrachna baculoscutata Crowell, 1960
 Hydrachna batorligetiensis Szalay, 1953
 Hydrachna bilobata Halik, 1940
 Hydrachna bimaculata Koenike
 Hydrachna bisignifera Viets & K.
 Hydrachna brehmi Szalay, 1955
 Hydrachna bulgarensis K.Viets, 1940
 Hydrachna canadensis Marshall, 1929
 Hydrachna comosa Koenike, 1896
 Hydrachna conjecta Koenike, 1895
 Hydrachna conjectoides Lundblad, 1947
 Hydrachna cordata
 Hydrachna crenulata Marshall, 1930
 Hydrachna cronebergi Koenike, 1897
 Hydrachna cruenta Muller, 1776
 Hydrachna curtiscutata
 Hydrachna danubialis Laska, 1964
 Hydrachna denudata Piersig, 1896
 Hydrachna distincta Koenike, 1897
 Hydrachna dorsoscutata Viets & K.
 Hydrachna eugeni K.H.Viets, 1911
 Hydrachna extorris Koenike, 1897
 Hydrachna geographica Muller, 1776
 Hydrachna georgei Soar, 1908
 Hydrachna globosa (De Geer, 1778)
 Hydrachna goldfeldi Thor, 1916
 Hydrachna guanajuatensis Cook
 Hydrachna halberti Soar, 1908
 Hydrachna hamata Lundblad, 1947
 Hydrachna hesperia Lundblad, 1934
 Hydrachna heterophthalma Viets & K.
 Hydrachna hormuzakii Husiatinschi, 1937
 Hydrachna hungerfordi Lundblad, 1934
 Hydrachna hutchinsoni Lundblad, 1934
 Hydrachna incognita (Wainstein, 1976)
 Hydrachna inermis Piersig, 1895
 Hydrachna inversa Walter, 1927
 Hydrachna juncta Walter, 1926
 Hydrachna laceriscuta Lundblad, 1941
 Hydrachna leegei Koenike
 Hydrachna levigata Koenike, 1897
 Hydrachna levis Williamson, 1913
 Hydrachna linderi Lundblad, 1947
 Hydrachna longiscutata
 Hydrachna lupus Wainstein, 1976
 Hydrachna magniscutata Marshall, 1927
 Hydrachna marita Wainstein, 1966
 Hydrachna marshallae Lundblad, 1934
 Hydrachna microscutata Marshall, 1929
 Hydrachna miliaria Berlese, 1888
 Hydrachna miyazakii Uchida, 1937
 Hydrachna multipora Cook, 1967
 Hydrachna mysorensis Cook, 1967
 Hydrachna mystomirabilis Habeed, 1954
 Hydrachna neocaledonica Smit, 2002
 Hydrachna nonlamellata Viets & K.
 Hydrachna novaehollandica
 Hydrachna oculoscutata Smit, 2002
 Hydrachna orientalis Thon, 1905
 Hydrachna paludosa
 Hydrachna palustris Smit, 1992
 Hydrachna papilligera K.H.Viets, 1919
 Hydrachna perpera Koenike, 1908
 Hydrachna piersigi Koenike, 1897
 Hydrachna processifera Koenike, 1903
 Hydrachna queenslandica
 Hydrachna rectirostris Viets & K.
 Hydrachna rhopaloidea K.H.Viets, 1942
 Hydrachna rotunda Marshall, 1930
 Hydrachna rubicunda K.H.Viets, 1930
 Hydrachna schneideri Koenike, 1895
 Hydrachna similans Marshall, 1928
 Hydrachna simulans Marshall, 1928
 Hydrachna sistanica Pesic, Smit & Saboori, 2012
 Hydrachna stipata Lundblad, 1934
 Hydrachna tasmanica Lundblad, 1947
 Hydrachna tchadensis Smit, 1994
 Hydrachna tenuissima Viets, 1935
 Hydrachna testudinata Cook
 Hydrachna trilobata Viets & K.
 Hydrachna triscutata Lundblad, 1947
 Hydrachna valida
 Hydrachna ventrifissa Viets & K.
 Hydrachna vulpes Wainstein, 1976
 Hydrachna williamsoni Soar, 1908

References

Further reading

 

Trombidiformes